Liga Deportiva Universitaria de Quito's 2020 season was the club's 90th year of existence, the 67th year in professional football, and the 59th in the top level of professional football in Ecuador.

Club

Personnel
President: Guillermo Romero
Honorary President: Rodrigo Paz
President of the Executive Commission: Esteban Paz
Sporting manager: Santiago Jácome

Coaching staff
Manager: Pablo Repetto
Assistant manager: Óscar Quagliatta, Joaquin Casales
Physical trainer: Marcelo Cabezas
Goalkeeper trainer: Luis Preti

Kits
Supplier: Puma
Sponsor(s): Banco Pichincha, Discover, GOL TV, Pilsener

Squad information

Note: Caps and goals are of the national league and are current as of the beginning of the season.

Winter transfers

Summer transfers

Competitions

Pre-season friendlies

LigaPro

The 2020 season was Liga's 59th season in the Serie A and their 19th consecutive.

First stage

Results summary

Results by round

Second stage

Results summary

Results by round

Finals

Results summary

Results by round

CONMEBOL Libertadores

L.D.U. Quito qualified to the 2020 CONMEBOL Libertadores—their 18th participation in the continental tournament—as Runner-up of the 2019 Serie A. They entered the competition in the group stage.

CONMEBOL Libertadores squad

1. Carlos Rodríguez left the club.
2. Antonio Valencia left the club.
3. Luis Arce left the club.
Source:

Group stage

Round of 16

Supercopa Ecuador

It was the first edition of the tournament. L.D.U. Quito entered the competition as champions of 2019 Copa Ecuador and became the first champion of the tournament.

Player statistics

Note: Players in italics left the club mid-season.

Team statistics

References

External links
  

2020
2020 in Ecuadorian football